The first lady of Kaduna State is the advisor to the Kaduna State governor, and often plays a role in social activism.  The position is traditionally held by the wife of the governor of Kaduna State, concurrent with his term of office,
although the Constitution of Nigeria does not recognize the office of the first lady.

Current
The present first lady of Kaduna state who is the spouse of the governor is incumbent Since 29 May 2015 and she is Hadiza Isma El-Rufai. At present, there are five living former first ladies since 1999 when Democratic rule was returned in Nigeria: Hajiya Asma'u Muhammad Makarfi (1999-2007), Hajiya Amina Namadi Sambo (2007-2010), Mrs Patrick Yakowa (2009-2012), Hajiya Fatima Ramalan Hero (2012-2015), and the present Hajiya Hadiza Isma El-Rufai (2015 to date)

References

Kaduna State
Nigerian politicians
Government of Kaduna State